The 1974–75 New York Islanders season was the third season for the franchise in the National Hockey League. During the regular season, the Islanders finished in third place in the Patrick Division with a 33–25–22 record and qualified for the Stanley Cup playoffs for the first time in the franchise's history. In the first round of the playoffs, New York defeated the New York Rangers in three games to advance to the Quarter-finals, where the team defeated the Pittsburgh Penguins in seven games, after they had lost the first three. The team almost repeated the feat in the next round, but lost in the semi-finals to the Philadelphia Flyers in seven games. In doing so, they set a record for most consecutive games won when facing elimination, 8.

Regular season

Season standings

Schedule and results

Playoffs

Round 1 (5) New York Islanders vs. (4) New York Rangers

New York Wins Series 2–1

Round 2 (5) New York Islanders vs (4) Pittsburgh Penguins

New York Wins Series 4–3

Round 3 (5) New York Islanders vs (1) Philadelphia Flyers

New York Loses Series 4–3

Player statistics

Note: Pos = Position; GP = Games played; G = Goals; A = Assists; Pts = Points; +/- = plus/minus; PIM = Penalty minutes; PPG = Power-play goals; SHG = Short-handed goals; GWG = Game-winning goals
      MIN = Minutes played; W = Wins; L = Losses; T = Ties; GA = Goals-against; GAA = Goals-against average; SO = Shutouts;

Awards & records

Transactions

Draft picks
The 1974 NHL amateur draft''' was held via conference call at the NHL office in Montreal, Quebec.  Below are listed the selections of the New York Islanders:

See also
 1974–75 NHL season

References

 1974–75 New York Rangers Statistics

New York Islanders seasons
New York Islanders
New York Islanders
New York Islanders
New York Islanders